Pala Casino Spa and Resort is a hotel casino and spa located in Pala on the Pala Indian Reservation northeast of San Diego, California. It is owned and operated by the Pala Band of Mission Indians, a federally recognized tribe.

The casino has 86,000 square-feet of casino floor, 2,250 slot machines, 84 table games, 9 restaurants, an  day spa, and 4 entertainment venues. The hotel has 500 rooms and 82 suites.

History 
In March 2000, construction began on the $115 million Pala Casino, which opened in April, 2001. On August 19, 2003, the Pala Casino Spa and Resort opened with 500 rooms, a spa, and a conference center. The project cost around $105 million to complete.

Dining
There are nine restaurants located within Pala Casino Spa and Resort.

See also
List of casinos in California
List of casino hotels

References 

Native American casinos
Casinos in San Diego County, California
Casino hotels
Casinos completed in 2001
2001 establishments in California
Native American history of California